The British Swimming Championships - 100 metres butterfly winners formerly the (Amateur Swimming Association (ASA) National Championships) are listed below.

The event was originally contested over 110 yards and then switched to the metric conversion of 100 metres in 1971.

Canadian Daniel Sherry broke the world record for 110 yards butterfly in the 1965 final, after setting a time of 58.1 sec. In 1985 there was a dead-heat for the women's final.

100 metres butterfly champions

See also
British Swimming
List of British Swimming Championships champions

References

Swimming in the United Kingdom